Rerhaia Airfield was a World War II military airfield in Algeria, located approximately 3 km northwest of Boudouaou, about 32 km east-southeast of Algiers.  It was used by the United States Army Air Force Twelfth Air Force 350th Fighter Group between July and November 1943 during the North African Campaign against the German Afrika Korps.

It was also used by the 416th Night Fighter Squadron, which flew Bristol Beaufighters from the field between 27 December 1943 – 25 January 1944.

Today, the remnants of the main runway and other areas can be seen in aerial photography.

References

 Maurer, Maurer. Air Force Combat Units of World War II. Maxwell AFB, Alabama: Office of Air Force History, 1983. .

External links

Defunct airports
Airfields of the United States Army Air Forces in Algeria
World War II airfields in Algeria
Airports established in 1943
Airports disestablished in 1944
1943 establishments in Algeria
1944 disestablishments in Algeria